Stary Kalkash (İśke Qalqaş) is a rural locality (a village) and the administrative centre of Starokalkashevsky Selsoviet, Sterlibashevsky District, Bashkortostan, Russia. The population was 349 as of 2010. There are 5 streets.

Geography 
Stary Kalkash is located 10 km northeast of Sterlibashevo (the district's administrative centre) by road. Novy Kalkash is the nearest rural locality.

References 

Rural localities in Sterlibashevsky District